Oxylaemus californicus is a species of beetle in the family Teredidae. It is found in North America.

References

Further reading

 

Polyphaga
Articles created by Qbugbot
Beetles described in 1874
Beetles of North America